Rhipidocarpon is a genus of fungi in the family Parmulariaceae. A monotypic genus, it contains the single species Rhipidocarpon javanicum.

References

External links
 Index Fungorum

Parmulariaceae
Monotypic Dothideomycetes genera